Momina Waheed is a Pakistani politician who was a member of the Provincial Assembly of the Punjab since August 2018 till January 2023.

In 2022, during the vote of confidence on the request of Governer Punjab, Momina Waheed betrayed and sold out herself against PTI. Now, she is in PMLN.

Political career

She was elected to the Provincial Assembly of the Punjab as a candidate of Pakistan Tehreek-e-Insaf (PTI) on a reserved seat for women in 2018 Pakistani general election..

References

Living people
Punjabi people
Punjab MPAs 2018–2023
Pakistan Tehreek-e-Insaf MPAs (Punjab)
Year of birth missing (living people)
Women members of the Provincial Assembly of the Punjab
21st-century Pakistani women politicians